Ophrys apollonae, the Apollona bee-orchid, is a very early flowering terrestrial species of orchid native to Greece (Rhodes, Chios and Samos islands) and Turkey (İzmir and Muğla provinces). Morphologically similar to Ophrys omegaifera, but usually with a short stem and with one (more rarely 2) small flowers, with length just above 1 cm. This bee orchid's lip is 11.7 - 13.7 mm long, much smaller than that of Ophrys omegaifera var. basilissa which is also a very early plant. It is proven that it attracts the bumble bee Anthophora nigriceps, a different pollinator than Ophrys omegaifera. Other differentiating characteristics include the way in which it  holds its flowers horizontally out from the top of the stem. Its name is a reference to the village of Apollona which nestles in the Southern foothills of the mountain on which it was discovered and studied.

Local names 
Greek οφρύς του Απόλλωνα 
Turkish uçarı salep

References

apollonae
Orchids of Europe
Flora of Greece
Flora of Turkey
Plants described in 2009